Opening theory may refer to:

 Backgammon opening theory
 Chess opening theory
 Go opening theory